KCSO-LD (channel 33) is a low-power television station in Sacramento, California, United States, airing programming from the Spanish-language Telemundo network. Owned and operated by NBCUniversal's Telemundo Station Group, KCSO-LD maintains studios on Media Place in the Woodlake neighborhood of Sacramento, and its transmitter is located in Walnut Grove, California. The station is also sister to regional sports networks NBC Sports Bay Area and NBC Sports California.

Due to its low-power status, KCSO-LD simulcasts in widescreen standard definition on CW affiliate KMAX-TV's digital channel 31.6 (displayed as channel 33.2). KCSO-LD also operates translator stations KMUM-CD and KMMW-LD in Sacramento and Stockton and also relies on cable and satellite to reach the entire market.

History

The station was founded by country-western performer Chester Smith and his company Sainte Partners II, L.P. and first signed on the air in 1999. It was the last station to be owned by his company. On August 8, 2008, Chester Smith died of heart failure at Stanford University Medical Center in Palo Alto, California. The station continued operating under the Sainte banner until it was sold to Serestar Communications Group in 2013. Sainte folded shortly thereafter.

In 2014, KCSO began simulcasting in widescreen standard definition on Ion owned-and-operated station KSPX-TV digital channel 29.7 (displayed as channel 33.2) to reach the entire market due to KCSO's low-power status. The simulcast was discontinued in October 2021.

Serestar agreed to sell KCSO-LD, KMUM-CD, and KMMW-LD to NBCUniversal on November 28, 2018, as part of a $21 million deal. The sale was completed on March 5, 2019. As a result, KCSO-LD becomes the sixth television station in the Sacramento market (excluding translator stations) to be owned-and-operated by its affiliated network.

In April 2022, CW owned-and-operated station KMAX-TV (now an affiliate) resumed the widescreen SD simulcast from KSPX-TV on a new digital channel 31.6 (also displayed as channel 33.2).

News operation
KCSO launched a local news department (with newscasts branded as Noticiero 33) following its sign-on. The half-hour local evening news program was broadcast every Monday through Friday at 6:00 p.m. However, it had low ratings and was canceled after five years.

Later, news briefs were aired online (branded as Telemundo 33 Al Día). In late 2014, it started airing morning news briefs called Noticias 33 Por la mañana, which aired at :25s and :55s from 7:00 a.m. to 9:00 a.m. during Telemundo's Un Nuevo Dia morning news program.

On November 6, 2016, KCSO re-launched a weekday half-hour long newscast at 6:00 p.m. (initially branding as Noticiero Telemundo 33, later as Noticias Telemundo Sacramento, now as Noticias Telemundo California after the purchase by NBCUniversal), 11 years after its initial newscast was cancelled. It directly competes with Univision owned-and-operated KUVS's long-established (and for several years, the Sacramento area's only) Spanish-language newscast.

In 2017, a weeknight 11:00 p.m. newscast (branded as Noticias Telemundo California) was launched, further competing with KUVS. Noticias Telemundo California is simulcast on Fresno sister station KNSO.

On March 18, 2020, one year after the purchase by NBCUniversal, the station launched 5 and 5:30 newscasts, and began simulcasting all of their newscasts on KNSO. The station does not air any local newscasts on the weekends.

Technical information

Subchannels
The station's digital signal is multiplexed:

On September 3, 2012, MeTV was moved to KCRA 3.2 (replacing the MoreTV format); 33.3 became silent afterward. 33.3 was re-launched on January 21, 2017, broadcasting TeleXitos.

In 2018, KCSO affiliated with Light TV on newly launched subchannel 33.4. TheGrio replaced Light TV after the channel shut down in January 2021.

Translators

References

External links

CSO-LD
Television channels and stations established in 1995
CSO-LD
Telemundo Station Group
Low-power television stations in the United States
1995 establishments in California
Telemundo network affiliates
TeleXitos affiliates
LX (TV network) affiliates